Gennadiy Komok (born 5 July 1987) is a Ukrainian handball player for HC Motor Zaporizhia and the Ukrainian national team.

He represented Ukraine at the 2020 European Men's Handball Championship.

References

1987 births
Living people
Ukrainian male handball players
Sportspeople from Zaporizhzhia
Expatriate handball players
Ukrainian expatriate sportspeople in Russia
HC Motor Zaporizhia players
ZTR players
21st-century Ukrainian people